Chavaniac-Lafayette (Occitan: Chavanhac de La Faieta) is a commune in the Haute-Loire department in south-central France.

The Château de Chavaniac, located in the commune, was the birthplace of Gilbert du Motier, Marquis de Lafayette in 1757. Originally named Chavaniac, the commune was renamed Chavaniac-Lafayette in 1884 in honor of its most famous resident.

Population

Gallery

See also
 Communes of the Haute-Loire department
 The Bastard (novel)

References

Communes of Haute-Loire